The Murray County School District is a public school district in Murray County, Georgia, United States, based in Chatsworth. It serves the communities of Chatsworth and Eton.

Schools
The Murray County School District has six elementary schools, two middle schools, and two high schools.

Elementary schools
Chatsworth Elementary School
Coker Elementary School
Eton Elementary School
Northwest Elementary School
Spring Place Elementary School
Woodlawn Elementary School

Middle school
Gladden Middle School
New Bagley Middle School

High schools
Murray County High School
North Murray High School

Academy
Pleasant Valley Innovative

References

External links

School districts in Georgia (U.S. state)
Education in Murray County, Georgia